Lorena Baumann (born 11 February 1997) is a Swiss footballer who plays as a defender for FC St. Gallen and the Switzerland national team.

Club career
In March 2022, Baumann signed with FC St. Gallen.

International career
Baumann made her debut for the Switzerland national team on 14 June 2019, as a starter against Serbia.

References

1997 births
Living people
Women's association football defenders
Swiss women's footballers
Switzerland women's international footballers
FC Zürich Frauen players
People from Toggenburg
Swiss Women's Super League players
Úrvalsdeild kvenna (football) players
Expatriate women's footballers in Iceland
Swiss expatriate footballers
Sportspeople from the canton of St. Gallen